"Someone Like You" is the first single by alternative rock band SafetySuit from their debut album, Life Left to Go. It peaked at No. 17 on the Billboard Modern Rock chart and No. 27 on the Adult Top 40 chart.

Chart performance

References

2008 singles
2008 songs
SafetySuit songs
Universal Motown Records singles